"Feel It Boy" is a song by Jamaican dancehall musician Beenie Man featuring American singer Janet Jackson from Beenie Man's 15th studio album, Tropical Storm (2002). The song was written by Beenie Man, Pharrell Williams, Chad Hugo, and Clancy Eccles and was produced by the Neptunes. Virgin Records released the song on 15 July 2002 as the lead single from the album. "Feel It Boy" peaked at number nine on the UK Singles Chart and became a top-40 hit in eight other countries, including the United States, where it peaked at number 28.

Song information
The song was written by Beenie Man and produced by award-winning duo the Neptunes. It was released as a single on 15 July 2002 peaking inside the top 20 and 30 of several countries. It spent 12 weeks on the Billboard Hot 100 peaking at number 28. It also peaked at number nine on the UK Singles Chart, becoming Jackson's 17th top ten single and last one to date. Jackson set the record for having the most top ten singles for a solo artist without reaching number one. The song appeared in the Japan-only radio promo sampler We Love Janet in 2006. It was also used as a DJ interlude on Jacksons 2015–2016 Unbreakable World Tour and her 2017 State of the World Tour.

In 2004, Jackson expressed her regret for the duet, saying "If I had known that (he was associated with homophobia), I would not have worked with him. It's shocking to me. We're on the same label, so I should have known. But at the same time, I wish someone from the company would have told me, knowing how... I feel about the gay community."

Music video
The music video was directed by Dave Meyers. Set on an island beach, it depicts different characters in their daily life with Jackson and Beenie Man on the beach enjoying the surroundings and different activities around them. Towards the end, Beenie Man pulls in a four-wheeler near Janet and begins to eye him with binoculars.  The video ends with a party that was mentioned in the song. The video was filmed on Westward Beach in Malibu, California.

Track listings

US CD single 
 "Feel It Boy" (album version) – 3:26
 "Feel It Boy" (Just Blaze Remix extended) – 5:24
 "Feel It Boy" (Joint Custody Remix extended) – 5:56
 "Feel It Boy" (Deep Dish Dancehall Remix) – 12:13

UK CD single 
 "Feel It Boy" – 3:26
 "Feel It Boy" (Just Blaze Remix edit) – 3:31
 "Feel It Boy" (Nikki Holliwood radio edit) – 3:51
 "Feel It Boy" (Deep Dish radio edit) – 3:47

UK 12-inch single 
A1. "Feel It Boy" (Nikki Holliwood radio edit) – 3:51
A2. "Feel It Boy" (Just Blaze Remix radio edit) – 3:31
B1. "Feel It Boy" (Deep Dish Dancehall Remix) – 12:13

UK cassette single 
 "Feel It Boy" (radio edit) – 3:22
 "Feel It Boy" (Just Blaze Remix radio edit) – 3:31

European CD single 
 "Feel It Boy" (radio edit) – 3:22
 "Bossman" (edited version featuring Lady Saw and Sean Paul) – 4:05

Australian CD single 
 "Feel It Boy" (radio edit) – 3:22
 "Bossman" (featuring Lady Saw and Sean Paul) – 4:05
 "Feel It Boy" (instrumental) – 3:35
 "Bossman" (instrumental) – 3:59

Charts

Weekly charts

Year-end charts

Certifications

Release history

References

2002 singles
Beenie Man songs
Janet Jackson songs
Music videos directed by Dave Meyers (director)
Song recordings produced by the Neptunes
Songs written by Chad Hugo
Songs written by Pharrell Williams